Alexeyisaurus is an extinct genus of possible plesiosaur known from the upper Triassic (lower-middle Norian age) of Wilczek Formation, Wilczek Land, of Franz Josef Land, Russia. It was first named by A. G. Sennikov and M. S. Arkhangelsky in 2010 and the type species is Alexeyisaurus karnoushenkoi. While considered an elasmosaur in the initial publication It has been described as a "partial, poorly preserved, and undiagnostic sauropterygian skeleton" in subsequent publications.

See also

 Timeline of plesiosaur research
 List of plesiosaur genera

References

Elasmosaurids
Triassic plesiosaurs
Fossil taxa described in 2010
Extinct animals of Russia
Plesiosaurs of Europe
Plesiosaurs of Asia
Sauropterygian genera